Lehmer's GCD algorithm, named after Derrick Henry Lehmer, is a fast GCD algorithm, an improvement on the simpler but slower Euclidean algorithm. It is mainly used for big integers that have a representation as a string of digits relative to some chosen numeral system base, say β = 1000 or β = 232.

Algorithm 
Lehmer noted that most of the quotients from each step of the division part of the standard algorithm are small. (For example, Knuth observed that the quotients 1, 2, and 3 comprise 67.7% of all quotients.) Those small quotients can be identified from only a few leading digits. Thus the algorithm starts by splitting off those leading digits and computing the sequence of quotients as long as it is correct.

Say we want to obtain the GCD of the two integers a and b. Let a ≥ b.
 If b contains only one digit (in the chosen base, say β = 1000 or β = 232), use some other method, such as the Euclidean algorithm, to obtain the result.
 If a and b differ in the length of digits, perform a division so that a and b are equal in length, with length equal to m.
 Outer loop: Iterate until one of a or b is zero:
 Decrease m by one. Let x be the leading (most significant) digit in a, x = a div β m and y the leading digit in b, y = b div β m.
 Initialize a 2 by 3 matrix
 to an extended identity matrix 
and perform the euclidean algorithm simultaneously on the pairs (x + A, y + C) and (x + B, y + D), until the quotients differ. That is, iterate as an inner loop:
 Compute the quotients w1 of the long divisions of (x + A) by (y + C) and w2 of (x + B) by (y + D) respectively. Also let w be the (not computed) quotient from the current long division in the chain of long divisions of the euclidean algorithm.
 If w1 ≠ w2, then break out of the inner iteration. Else set w to w1 (or w2).
 Replace the current matrix

 with the matrix product
 
according to the matrix formulation of the extended euclidean algorithm.
If B ≠ 0, go to the start of the inner loop.
 If B = 0, we have reached a deadlock; perform a normal step of the euclidean algorithm with a and b, and restart the outer loop.
 Set a to aA + bB and b to Ca + Db (again simultaneously). This applies the steps of the euclidean algorithm that were performed on the leading digits in compressed form to the long integers a and b. If b ≠ 0 go to the start of the outer loop.

References

 Kapil Paranjape, Lehmer's Algorithm

Number theoretic algorithms